L'ombrellone  or Weekend, Italian Style  is a 1966 Italian comedy-drama film directed by Dino Risi. It was co-produced with Spain and France. The soundtrack is full of Italian Pop songs from the 1960s.

Plot
Ferragosto in Rome. Everybody is on holidays on the beach, except Enrico Marletti (Enrico Maria Salerno), who spends the week working. On the weekends, he drives to Rimini to meet his wife Giuliana (Sandra Milo), but she is living her dolce vita (sweet life) and her husband is out of place amidst her chic friends.

Cast
Sandra Milo: Giuliana Marletti
Enrico Maria Salerno: Enrico Marletti
Jean Sorel: Sergio
Daniela Bianchi: Isabella Dominici
Lelio Luttazzi: Conte Antonio Bellanca
Raffaele Pisu: Pasqualino
Leopoldo Trieste: professor. Ferri
Trini Alonso: Clelia Valdameri
Alicia Brandet: Vicina di stanza
Véronique Vendell: Giuliana
Pepe Calvo: Mr. Tagliaferri
Antonella Della Porta: Miss De Rossi
Solvi Stubing: Miss Marini

External links
 

1966 films
Films set in Italy
Films set in Rome
Films set in Emilia-Romagna
Films shot in Rome
Italian comedy-drama films
Spanish comedy-drama films
French comedy-drama films
1960s Italian-language films
1966 comedy-drama films
Commedia all'italiana
Films directed by Dino Risi
1960s Italian films
1960s French films